Traffic Sound was a Peruvian rock band founded in 1967 by Manuel Sanguinetti (vocals), Freddy Rizo-Patrón (rhythm guitar), Jean Pierre Magnet (sax), Willy "Wilito" Barclay (lead guitar), Willy Thorne (bass, died 2019) and Luis "Lucho" Nevares (drums). Freddy and Manuel had met in school and played in Los Hang Ten's. Freddy and his older brother Jose originally thought of founding "Traffic Sound".

The name was chosen because of their penchant for a traffic light, placed as a souvenir in the attic of the Rizo-Patróns house where they held their practices after a wild night in Lima.

Albums

After a year of continued rehearsals and private shows and with the guidance of their manager, Jorge Manuel Vegas (b. Iquitos, Peru, December 20, 1944,d.  Oslo, Norway April 17, 1987 ), the band  tried their luck at Peruvian psychedelic emporium The Tiffany with great success and recorded his first album "A Bailar Go Go" in 1968 with label MAG. It contained versions of songs by The Doors, Cream, Jimi Hendrix, Iron Butterfly and The Animals. In later albums they included their own music with a fusion of Andean and Afro-Latin sounds. They held gigs in Peru, Chile, Argentina and Brazil.

Their second album "Virgin" (1969), all original material contains Peruvian Psychedelia hit, "Meshkalina".

In 1970 they recorded another LP named "Traffic Sound", aka. III, aka. "Tibet's Suzettes", where they blend the Psychedelic spirit with an Andean folk sound, and give the necessary step to be closer than ever to progressive rock.

In 1971 Braniff International Airways organized the first South American Tour of a Peruvian band, and Traffic Sound was well received in demanding markets such as Argentina and Brazil.

After the tour they switched to bigger label Sono Radio and released four singles. At this point Willy Thorne left the band and was replaced by Zulu (Miguel Angel Ruiz Orbegoso) on bass and keyboards, with whom they recorded their last LP, "Lux". During a strike at Sono Radio the master tapes disappeared and were only found in 1996. This album is different to the previous, the Andean influence is more evident and some political concerns were expressed.

The band held a memorable concert at the Teatro Segura in Lima together with the Contemporary Orchestra of Peruvian jazz pianist Jaime Delgado Aparicio in 1971 and disbanded in 1972.

Aftermath

Saxophonist Jean Pierre Magnet began a successful solo career.

In 1973, bassist/keyboardist Zulu was asked by IEMPSA to record his own album (label ODEON). After three releases, a mention in Billboard magazine and his music being heard among much of Latin America and the Latin market in New York, he retired because of a devoted desire for preaching the Bible.

Singer Manuel Sanguinetti founded Radio Doble Nueve, Peru's rock radio station, in 1979.

In 1993, Traffic Sound members got together again for a concert at Muelle Uno, Miraflores, and launched new versions of their old hits, a London remasterization CD of "Virgin" for Europe. Since 2005 they have met several times (at Hotel Los Delfines, Asia beach and The Dragon Racing Club of Punta Hermosa). Repsychled Records has since re-released "Virgin".

Two of their songs, "Lux" and "Yesterday's Game" were used in episodes of American TV series Life on Mars.

They returned in 2005. True to their style, the presentations were at luxurious clubs and hotels in Lima (Hotel Los Delfines, Asia, Club de Regatas Lima and El Dragon de Punta Hermosa). 

Then, from 2015 thru 2017, the group was reunited again with Willy Barclay Jr. on second guitar and Zulu on bass at the "Teatro Peruano Japonés", Lima, Peru, to a full house. They then played at "Teatro Fénix", Arequipa, and at the "Gran Teatro Nacional", Lima.

The setlists of these two unforgettable concerts at the Peruano Japones theater are:

Saturday October 17

1. MESHKALINA II

2. FIRE

3. TIBET’S SUZZETE

4. BROWN EYED GIRL

5. DEALING

6. SKY PILOT

7. VIRGIN

8. I’VE BEEN WAITING FOR YOU

9. JEW’S CABOOSE

10. THOSE DAYS HAVE GONE

11. SHE’S ABOUT A MOVER

12. YESTERDAY’S GAME

13. AMERICA

14. LAST SONG

15. SIMPLE

16. LUX

17. INCA SNOW

18. CHICAMA WAY

19. MESHKALINA

Thursday October 22:

1. MESHKALINA II

2. FIRE

3. TIBET’S SUZZETE

4. BROWN EYED GIRL

5. DEALING

6. I’M SO GLAD

7. YESTERDAY’S GAME

8. YOU CAN’T WIN

9. SEASON OF THE WITCH

10. LUX

11. INCA SNOW

12. SHE’S ABOUT A MOVER

13. GLORIA

14. LAST SONG

15. SIMPLE

16. VIRGIN

17. YELLOW SEA DAYS

18. CHICAMA WAY

19. MESHKALINA

20. SACALA A BAILAR

21. LA CAMITA

"Meshkalina" (1968)

Lyrics of Traffic Sound's most popular hit contain references to the Inca civilization of Peru:

Yáhuar Huaca wondered why he was high once

Raped the witch and killed the wild Ayarmaca

Let me down meshkalina

Let me down meshkalina

Full of bull he was, oh God let me tell you

Spread the weed one day, all over his empire

Let me down meshkalina

Let me down meshkalina

F*** stayed for fifteen days in his lab once

He said, "Man it's here, let's try my new substance"

Give me some meshkalina

Give me some meshkalina

We went driving hard and wild across the country

We were having fun, even though we were dying

Let me die meshkalina

Let me die meshkalina

Now I know it's time for you to start learning

About the games we play everyday, every morning

Discography

Albums

A Bailar Go Go (1968)
Virgin (1969)
Traffic Sound, a.k.a. III, a.k.a. Tibet's Suzettes (1971)
Lux (1971)
Yellow Sea Years (2005)
Greatest Hits (2005)

Singles

Sky Pilot-Fire (1968)
You Got Me Floating-Sueño (1968)
I'm So Glad-Destruction (1968)
La Camita-You Got To Be Sure (1971)
Suavecito-Solos (1971)

References

Peruvian rock music groups
Musical groups established in 1967